Collectif Némésis is an organisation in France and Switzerland for women aged 18 to 30, describing itself as feminist and identitarian. The organisation is named after Nemesis, the Greek goddess of revenge, and was founded by Alice Cordier in 2019. The organisation believes that non-European immigrants, particularly Muslims, present an elevated risk of violence towards women. The organisation has been condemned as racist by mainstream feminist organisations.

History
The organisation first appeared on 23 November 2019 at the "Nous Toutes" (All of us Women) demonstration in Paris, in which it carried placards saying that 52% of rapists in Île-de-France were foreign, and ones reading "Cologne, Rotherham, soon [Paris]". After the event, the group said that other feminist groups are run by the extreme left and "prefer to focus on anecdotal themes (inclusive writing, sexism in advertising, etc.). And they only deal with the violence that women suffer daily (such as street harassment) by drowning it in abstract concepts such as that of patriarchy, to hide the fact that our attackers are massively of non-European origin". In January 2021, the group wore niqab at the Eiffel Tower to promote a "No Hijab Day" in opposition to World Hijab Day.

In 2021, the group launched in Romandy, the French-speaking part of Switzerland. The Swiss group has tried to gain attention at the Grève feministe (Feminist strike), whose representatives responded that "This group is riding the purple bandwagon and uses it not to promote the freedom of women, but rather the discrimination towards its targets, notably foreigners". By June 2022, Némésis had been expelled three times from events organised by Grève feministe. In April 2022, it was expelled from a social event organised by the University of Geneva.

References

External links
Official website (in French)

2019 establishments in France
Anti-Islam sentiment in France
Identitarian movement in France